The Jacobus Vanderveer House, also known as Knox House, is a U.S. Federal style house located just north of the community of Pluckemin in Bedminster Township, Somerset County, New Jersey at the junction of US 202 and 206 north of River Road. The house was added to the National Register of Historic Places on September 29, 1995, and noted as an "excellent example of a Dutch–American house". The Vanderveer /Knox House & Museum while owned by Bedminster Township, is operated under the direction of the Friends of the Jacobus Vanderveer House, a 501-C3 non-profit organization. The Jacobus Vanderveer House is situated on part of the  that make up River Road Park. The house was thought to be built somewhere in the mid-1770s by James (Jacobus) Vanderveer, son to Jacobus Vanderveer after the property was willed to him by his father.

The house is notable as being the headquarters for General Henry Knox during the second Middlebrook encampment during the Revolutionary War (1778–79). Knox was in command of the Continental Army Artillery Cantonment, what is now known as America's first military training academy, the forerunner to the United States Military Academy at West Point. What was then known as the Pluckemin Continental Artillery Cantonment Site is near the Vanderveer/Knox house, which happens to be the only remaining original structure on the fringe of the cantonment.

Each year, the Jacobus Vanderveer House hosts a "colonial christmas" event to raise funds for the ongoing maintenance and preservation of the historic site. The event includes tree-lighting ceremony, traditional christmas decorations and other festivities.

See also 
Other houses used as headquarters during the second Middlebrook encampment (1778–79):
 Wallace House – General George Washington
 Van Veghten House – General Nathanael Greene
 Van Horne House – General William Alexander, Lord Stirling
 Staats House – General Friedrich Wilhelm von Steuben

References

External links 

The Jacobus vanderveer House & Museum
Pluckemin Artillery Cantonment
General Knox Museum
 Somerset Hills History Coloring Book
Somerset Hills

Houses completed in 1779
Federal architecture in New Jersey
Houses on the National Register of Historic Places in New Jersey
Houses in Somerset County, New Jersey
Museums in Somerset County, New Jersey
Historic house museums in New Jersey
American Revolutionary War museums in New Jersey
National Register of Historic Places in Somerset County, New Jersey
New Jersey Register of Historic Places
American Revolution on the National Register of Historic Places
New Jersey in the American Revolution
Bedminster, New Jersey